George Appleby (died 1999) was a Canadian film and television editor. He is most noted as a two-time winner of the Canadian Film Award for Best Editing, winning in 1968 for Isabel and in 1978 for The Silent Partner.

His other credits included the films The Far Shore, Partners, Outrageous!, Deadly Harvest, Wild Horse Hank and Too Outrageous!, and the television series The Forest Rangers, Adventures in Rainbow Country, The Ray Bradbury Theatre, Neon Rider and Cold Squad.

He served on the founding board of directors of the Academy of Canadian Cinema and Television.

References

External links

1999 deaths
Canadian film editors
Best Editing Genie and Canadian Screen Award winners